Los 40 (The 40, stylized as LOS40 and formerly Los 40 Principales) is a Top 40 music radio network and radio station brand in many Spanish-speaking countries from PRISA Radio. The station has its origins as a music show at Radio Madrid, today Cadena SER in 1966, where the 40 Principales chart was born, then evolved into a standalone radio station in 1979. LOS40 is the number one music station in most of the regions it serves.

Some stations under this brand name are owned and operated or are licensed by PRISA to use the brand. Some LOS40 stations are operated by a local broadcasting company and affiliated with the company that holds a license to use the brand from Grupo PRISA. Each LOS40 network typically broadcasts its own national feed from its respective country.

LOS40 stations broadcast in:

Most LOS40 networks generally air Spanish and English contemporary hit music that mostly includes American, Latin American, Pan-European and British singers and bands. Most stations emphasize Latin Top 40 music; however Mexico and Panama stations feature more European and English-language music whilst Chile and Costa Rica stations plays more reggaeton and bachata. It has a high-rotation playlist consisting mainly of tracks from its private chart. The main music genres that can be heard are pop, pop-rock and some dance music from the '90s, '00s and present day.

Countries where it previously had a presence:
Colombia: As of 1 July 2020, the Caracol Radio directive belonging to the PRISA group due to temporary issues replaces LOS40 Colombia with Oxygen by LOS40 station of 'Urbano' format under the musical genres of reggaeton, bachata and electrónica.
Nicaragua: Replaced by La Buenísima.
Paraguay: Replaced by an evangelic radio station.

History 
In 1965, the Ministry of Information and Tourism passed a law forcing medium wave radio stations to launch FM stations to develop FM in Spain. Due to the high costs of producing new shows, most of the schedule for the new stations was based on music, mainly classical music. In 1966, Cadena SER asked one of its broadcasters, Rafael Revert, to develop a new music show aimed at a younger audience. So he took the idea of the Top 40 and created a chart with the 40 top singles of the week, which would be voted on by the audience. So, on 18 July 1966, the first show of Los 40 Principales was broadcast on Radio Madrid, marking the debut of the chart list, with Monday Monday by The Mamas & the Papas as the first N°1.

Soon, the show would be broadcast on ten Cadena SER radio stations. At first it was a daily show, revealing candidates during the week, and the new list each Saturday. The viewers would phone each station to vote for their favorite songs. The show was recorded in Madrid, then the tape was sent to all of the affiliate stations throughout Spain and broadcast simultaneously. The duration of the show was increased during the 70s from the original 1 hour to 2, 4 and finally 8 hours by the end of the 1970s. In 1979, Cadena SER decided to make 40 Principales a standalone radio network, which would be dedicated to the chart and its candidates 24 hours a day (what is later known, in Spanish, as radiofórmula). At first, the 40 Principales stations were still part of Cadena SER, becoming an independent network in 1987, though still owned by Grupo PRISA alongside Cadena SER. In 1985, the 40 Principales main station began broadcasting live by satellite throughout Spain.

In 1990, the chart show started being broadcast also on TV through Canal+, and in 1998 also on the newly created 40 Principales TV satellite channel. The chart show got its present name, Del 40 al 1 (From 40 to 1), in 1995. During the 2000s, 40 Principales was expanded through Latin American opening some 400 stations in Spanish-speaking countries with either local media companies operating stations within a country or listening area or PRISA operating a company within a country.

In May 2016, Los 40 Principales re-branded as simply LOS40. The main reason was that the station "is so much more than a top 40 list".

In September 2017, the LOS40 TV channel was shut down after almost two decades of broadcasting.

Game 40
Los 40 ran a program in Spain dedicated to video games, under the name Game 40, from 1992 to 1998. It aired in the evening each Sunday. The show was first hosted by Juan Luis Ferrer, but he was eventually replaced by Guillem Caballé; a writer for La Razón later said that Caballé transitioned the program into "a very dynamic and fun style." During Caballé's tenure, the program aired reviews, news and comedy segments interpersed with music from anime and video game soundtracks. Caballé was joined by co-hosts Manuel Martín Vivaldi, Ángel Ortiz and Carlos Ulloa. Game 40 was highly popular, and by late 1996 its website was among Los 40's most visited pages. Its radio broadcast ultimately attained more than 500,000 regular listeners, despite competing directly with the sports coverage program Carrusel Deportivo. In 2008, Enrique García of MeriStation described Game 40 as "legendary", a sentiment echoed by La Razóns writer in 2019. The program was canceled in October 1998, with its final episode aired on the fourth of that month. According to author David Martínez, Game 40 proceeded to influence later game-focused radio shows in Spain, including Top Radio's Top Game (1998–2001).

Controversy
In December 2014, DJ Paul Hip asked listeners of 40 Principales Chile what they would do for free music concert festival tickets. The radio station hosted a competition for contestants to come up with their own challenges. If their challenge was accepted by the radio DJ, they were given the opportunity to complete it to win the tickets.

One female listener offered to do "actually anything, up to and including licking whipped cream out of a human anus" to win tickets to the Mysteryland EDM festival. Hip took the woman up on the proposal - in the middle of his show. On 17 December 2014, she completed the act live on air. Hip then proceeded to invite listeners of the radio station to kiss the woman who had just licked whipped cream from his anus to win tickets of their own.

The radio station's production team tweeted an uncensored image of the act, which went viral over Twitter and caused controversy, with Twitter followers calling the act "misogynist and humiliating" and questioning the station's ethics and journalistic integrity. The radio station later issued an apology saying they were sorry if they had offended their audience and they probably should not have accepted such challenge, but assured it was completely "voluntary and even suggested by the participant" in a contest that was open to what ever each contestant wanted to do. The radio station deleted the tweet promptly after the negative reactions and assured their fans the contest's only purpose was to have fun, and not to hurt or demean anyone.

Stations

See also
 40 TV
 PRISA

References

External links
Los 40 Official Website
Los 40 Argentina Official Website
Los 40 Chile Official Website
Los 40 Colombia Official Website
Los 40 Costa Rica Official Website
Los 40 Dominican Republic Official Website
Los 40 Ecuador Official Website
Los 40 Guatemala Official Website
Los 40 Mexico Official Website
Los 40 Panama Official Website
Los 40 Paraguay Official Website
Game 40 Official Website (archived)

1979 establishments in Spain
International radio networks
Radio stations in Spain
PRISA